Kākā Vidura is a Hindi minor poem composed by Jagadguru Rambhadracharya (1950–) in the year 1980. It consists of 108 verses in Kavitta and Savaiya metres. The poem revolves around the characters of Vidura and his wife Sulabha from the Mahabharata.

External links
 Kākā Vidura online

Hindi-language literature